Brain-enriched guanylate kinase-associated protein is an enzyme that in humans is encoded by the BEGAIN gene.

Interactions 

BEGAIN has been shown to interact with Retinoblastoma-like protein 1.

References

External links

Further reading